Robert Ralph Scrymgeour Hiscox  (born January 1943) is a British businessman, art collector, and philanthropist. He was chairman of Hiscox Ltd, a firm of Lloyd's of London underwriters, for 43 years until his retirement in 2013.

Career
Hiscox is the son of Ralph Hiscox CBE, who was a founding partner in Roberts & Hiscox in 1946. He was educated at Rugby School, followed by Corpus Christi College, Cambridge, where he earned a degree in economics and law. He joined Hiscox Ltd in 1965 as an underwriter of fine art and personal accident insurance.

His father died in 1970 and he took control of the partnership, with Anthony Roberts, the other co-founder, moving aside. Roberts & Hiscox gradually incorporated, starting in 1993 becoming Hiscox plc. It grew from a Lloyd's underwriter to the international insurance company, Hiscox Ltd, headquartered in Bermuda. He was the company's chairman for 43 years until his retirement in 2013, then honorary president until 2017.

Hiscox was deputy chairman of Lloyd's from 1993 to 1995, and helped save it from the brink of collapse.

Philanthropy
Hiscox is chairman of the Wiltshire Bobby Van Trust, which provides home security advice for elderly, vulnerable and disadvantaged people throughout Wiltshire. He is chairman of the Kenneth Armitage Foundation and the Paolozzi Foundation, which protect and enhance the reputations of the artists and support sculptors. He is chairman of the Swindon Museum and Art Gallery Trust which was established in 2015 to build a new museum and art gallery to transform the centre of Swindon.  He chairs the Hiscox Foundation, the charitable foundation of Hiscox plc.

He has hosted the Wiltshire Steam and Vintage Rally annually in June for a number of years, at Rainscombe Park, Oare, Wiltshire. In 2014, he saved the White Horse Bookshop on Marlborough High Street from closure. He was High Sheriff of Wiltshire in 2011–2012 and a Deputy Lieutenant of Wiltshire until 2018.

Personal life
Hiscox was married first to Lucy Mills, and secondly to Lady Julia Meade (third daughter of the 6th Earl of Clanwilliam). He has five sons, and lives in Wiltshire.

References

1943 births
Living people
British businesspeople in insurance
British art collectors
British Eurosceptics
Insurance underwriters
People educated at Rugby School
Alumni of Corpus Christi College, Cambridge
Deputy Lieutenants of Wiltshire